The People's Heritage Party (PHP) was a political party in Ghana.

Formation
The PHP was one of the eight political parties formed when the ban on party politics was lifted in 1992 in Ghana. It claimed to follow the Nkrumahist philosophy.

Elections
The PHP did not win any seats in the Ghanaian parliamentary election in 1992. This was the first and only parliamentary election that it participated. Its candidate in the 1992 Ghanaian presidential election in 1992 was Lt. Gen. Emmanuel Erskine. He came last out of the five candidates with 1.7% of the total vote.

Merger
In 1993, the PHP merged with the National Independence Party, another party that followed Nkrumah's ideology to form the People's Convention Party.

See also
Convention People's Party

References 

1992 in Ghana
Defunct political parties in Ghana
Nkrumaist political parties
Pan-Africanism in Ghana
Pan-Africanist political parties in Africa
Political parties established in 1992
Socialist parties in Ghana